Acompsia schmidtiellus is a moth of the family Gelechiidae. It is found in central, eastern and southern Europe, from Denmark to southern Spain and Portugal. In the east, the range extends to Ukraine.

The wingspan is 14–16 mm for males and 15–17 mm for females. The forewings are light orange-brown, mottled with some black scales. Females have more plain orange-brown forewings. The hindwings are grey. Adults are on wing from June to late August.

The larvae feed on Origanum vulgare, Mentha arvensis, Mentha silvestris, Mentha rotundifolia, Calamintha nepeta and Clinopodium vulgare. They fold a leaf of their host plant and spin it together. The larvae are yellow white with a shining dark brown head. Pupation takes place in a folded leaf or between dry leaves on the ground.

References

Moths described in 1848
Taxa named by Carl von Heyden
Acompsia
Moths of Europe